Reginald F. Lewis High School of Business and Law (officially referred to as the Reginald F. Lewis High School) is a public high school located in northeast Baltimore, Maryland. It is named after prominent businessman and Baltimore native Reginald F. Lewis. The school is situated in the former Northern High School and shares the structure with the W. E. B. Du Bois High School.

Attack incidents
On April 4, 2008 an art teacher at the Reginald F. Lewis High School, was attacked by one of her students during a regular class. Footage of the incident was recorded on a phone and was uploaded to the internet.

On April 2, 2015 former Principal Daric Jackson caused a student to lose consciousness in a classroom after placing the student in a chokehold. The case was investigated as possible child abuse by the Baltimore police department and referred to the State's Attorney's office. The student filed a lawsuit in April 2016 alleging assault.

References

External links
 
 Reginald F. Lewis High School - Maryland Report Card

Public schools in Baltimore
Public high schools in Maryland